America's Supernanny (also known as America's Supernanny: Family Lockdown) is an American reality documentary television series broadcast on Lifetime. It is a spin-off on the ABC series Supernanny. The series aired from November 29, 2011, to March 13, 2013.

Production History
On August 9, 2011, Lifetime announced they had green-lit the series for an eight episode first season but the network had yet to decide who was going to lead the series. On October 6, 2011, after numerous casting calls, it was announced that Deborah Tillman was chosen to be "America's Supernanny".

On December 4, 2012, Lifetime announced that the series had been renewed for a second season, which debuted on January 8, 2013, with the new title America's Supernanny: Family Lockdown. Tillman visited the homes of families who requested her help to raise their children, and the families were visited on notice, rather than by surprise.

Episodes

Season 1 (2011–12)

Season 2 (2013)

References

External links
 
 
 

2010s American documentary television series
2010s American reality television series
2011 American television series debuts
2013 American television series endings
American television spin-offs
English-language television shows
Lifetime (TV network) original programming
Reality television spin-offs
Television series about children
Works about child care occupations